Jacques Alexandre (* 18 July 1944) is a French photographer known for his artistic photography of women, children, and landscapes in two main artistic styles: First his romantic "impressionism period" in the 1970s, influenced by the impressionism paintings and then his "hyperrealistic period" starting in the 1980s, with straight compositions and strong colors. He is also well known for his lifestyle images for the medias worldwide.

Education 
Jacques Alexandre was born in Arcachon, France. He first attended the high school in Biarritz, then the "Ecole des Beaux-Arts" high school in Bayonne. With a bursary from the Franco-German Youth Office, he attended from 1966 until 1968 the Technical University of Cologne, in Cologne, Germany, class of photography, graduating with a Bachelor's degree. In 1968 he also obtained the master craftsman certification for photography at the same university.

Career and style 
Right after his graduation in 1968, he started working as fashion and advertising photographer for Willy Gursky, the father of Andreas Gursky. In 1969 he was head photographer for advertising and fashion in the advertising studios of the department store Kaufhof in Cologne, Germany. From 1970 until 1975 he worked as freelance cameraman for the German television station WDR. During this time he began doing work for international art publications in a romantic soft focus style, being influenced by the Impressionism and Romantic Era.

His further successes included dozens of photographic books, calendars, posters, puzzles with combined sales well into the millions. Besides his main theme of depicting natural young women, couples and children, Jacques Alexandre also made pictures of landscapes, flowers and still life. Several of his photographs look like oil paintings. Most of his work gives an impression of timelessness because it was made in a preserved nature without buildings, cars and people. His photography was compared to painters like Caspar David Friedrich, Claude Monet or Pierre-Auguste Renoir.

In the '80s began his "hyperrealistic period", with straight compositions and strong colors, also for photographic books, calendars, posters, puzzles and magazines. His new style was reported in prestigious magazines like Zoom and Photo Magazine, Paris, France. As printed art works declined because of the emerging technologies, Jacques Alexandre decided to also create photographs for the medias and make his images accessible worldwide through stock agencies.

In 1998 he published his own printed photo catalogue "The Best Of Jacques Alexandre" for the leading Stock Agencies (DIN A4, 208 pages, 85.000 copies) with 1.008 images of kids, families, beauty, lifestyle, landscape, nature, stills and artistic works. Today, 8,000 images by Jacques Alexandre can be found worldwide through Stock Agencies.

In the '190s, 80s and 90s, Jacques Alexandre used to spend every year several months on the Spanish island of Ibiza and in Southern France and worked with mostly natural, non-professional models. In the 90s, he started large life style photo productions for stock in Southern France and on the Maldives with a staff of professional models, assistants and makeup artists.
The artistic images of Jacques Alexandre contain no after effects in the photo laboratory or digitally, everything has to be done during the photo shooting. This process requires an exact concept, organisation, preparation and meticulous working on the set, nothing must be subject to fortuity.

Awards 
 1966 – 1st Award of the Franco-German Youth Office (FGYO)
 1970 – Award of the Asahi Pentax World Photo Contest
 1980 – Kodak Photo Book Award for his children book "The Little Red Cat", published by Belser Reich Verlag, Lucerne, Switzerland

Selected books 
 "Der kleine rote Kater" (The Little Red Cat), 1980 – Belser Reich Verlag, Switzerland – 
 "The best nudes", 1981 – Haga Shoten, Japan – 
 "Jacques Alexandre 1", 1982 – NGS, Japan –  C3072
 "Jacques Alexandre 2", 1982 – NGS, Japan –  C3072
 "Aktfotos meisterhaft gestalten", 1992 – Knapp Verlag, Germany – 
 "Jacques Alexandre", 1994 – NGS, Japan –

Selected magazine pictorials

References

External links 

Jacques Alexandre's official website

French photographers
1944 births
Living people
20th-century French photographers
21st-century French photographers